Akpınar (a Turkish toponym meaning "white spring" or "white fountain") may refer to:

People
Hüseyin Mutlu Akpınar (born 1969), Turkish politician
Ismet Akpınar (born 1995), German basketball player
Mehmet Akpınar (born 1940), Turkish fencer
Metin Akpınar (born 1941), Turkish actor

Places
Akpınar, Adıyaman, a village in the central district of Adıyaman Province, Turkey
Akpınar, Alaca
Akpınar, Bartın, a village in the central district of Bartın Province, Turkey
Akpınar, Bayat, a village in the district of Bayat, Afyonkarahisar Province, Turkey
Akpınar, Başmakçı, a village in the district of Başmakçı, Afyonkarahisar Province, Turkey
Akpınar, Bayramiç
Akpınar, Besni, a village in the district of Besni, Adıyaman Province, Turkey
Akpınar, Biga
Akpınar, Borçka, a village in the district of Borçka, Artvin Province, Turkey
Akpınar, Bozüyük, a village in the district of Bozüyük, Bilecik Province, Turkey
Akpınar, Çameli
Akpınar, Çermik
Akpınar, Cumayeri
Akpınar, Daday, a village in Turkey
Akpınar, Erdemli, a village and summer resort in the district of Erdemli, Mersin Province, Turkey
Akpınar, Gümüşhacıköy, a village in the district of Gümüşhacıköy, Amasya Province, Turkey
Akpınar, Harmancık
Akpınar, İskilip
Akpınar, İspir
Akpınar, Karayazı
Akpınar, Kahta, a village in the district of Kahta, Adıyaman Province, Turkey
Akpınar, Karakoçan
Akpınar, Kumlu, a village in Kumlu district of Hatay province, Turkey
Akpınar, Kırşehir, a town in Kırşehir Province, Turkey
Akpınar, Mecitözü
Akpınar, Merzifon, a village in the district of Merzifon, Amasya Province, Turkey
Akpınar, Nazilli, a village in the District of Nazilli, Aydın Province, Turkey
Akpınar, Ortaköy, a village in the district of Ortaköy, Aksaray Province, Turkey
Akpınar, Savaştepe, a village
Akpınar, Sungurlu
Akpınar, Tufanbeyli, a village in the district of Tufanbeyli, Adana Province, Turkey 
Akpınar, Yüreğir, a village in the district of Yüreğir, Adana Province, Turkey

See also
Akpınarlı, Dinar, a village in the Dinar district of Afyonkarahisar Province, Turkey

Turkish-language surnames